Conductor, founded in 2006, started as a marketing services company. In 2010, it launched its cloud-based software platform called Conductor Searchlight, which provides SEO and content marketing solutions. The platform also offers suggestions for optimizing digital marketing metrics and increasing revenue.

In 2018, it was announced that WeWork would acquire Conductor. However, in 2019, the company spun off from WeWork to become an independent employee-owned company, with all its employees becoming co-founders.

Insight Stream
In 2016, Conductor introduced Insight Stream, a solution that combines data from multiple marketing technologies including Deepcrawl, Dragon Metrics, and Google Search Console into a single stream.

The Conductor Foundation
The Conductor Foundation, the philanthropic branch of Conductor, provides annual grants to mission-based organizations that include access to the company's technology and support to enhance their digital marketing efforts.

History
Conductor was established by Jeremy Duboys and Seth Besmertnik in New York City in 2006. 

In 2012, the company achieved the 38th position on the Inc. 500 list of US companies, which ranks companies by their highest growth percentage, and received a $20 million financing. Conductor has received recognition as one of the best places to work in the small to medium-sized category in New York state from the Crain organization for 8 consecutive years. 

In 2014, the company expanded its operations by opening an office in San Francisco. In February 2015, Conductor received a $27 million Series D round of funding. Seth Besmertnik is the CEO of the company.

In March 2018, it was announced that WeWork was acquiring Conductor. 

Later, on December 12, 2019, it was announced that Conductor would become an independent employee-owned company after spinning off from WeWork. 

On February 16, 2022, Conductor acquired ContentKing, a real-time SEO monitoring platform, after securing $150 million in funding.

References

WeWork
Marketing companies established in 2006
2018 mergers and acquisitions
Search engine optimization companies
Search engine optimization consultants
Defunct software companies of the United States
Companies based in New York City
Software companies established in 2006
2006 establishments in New York City
2019 mergers and acquisitions